Conca de Dalt is a municipality (municipi) in the comarca of the Pallars Jussà in Catalonia, Spain. The municipal territory extends to both the east and west of la Pobla de Segur, on the 
sides of the valley of the Noguera Pallaresa river. The municipality was known as Pallars Jussà from its formation in 1969 (by the fusion of twelve smaller municipalities) until 1995, 
when the name was changed to avoid confusion with the comarca.

Subdivisions 
The municipality of Conca de Dalt is composed of twelve settlements: populations are given as of 2005.
Aramunt (103)
Claverol (26)
Erinyà (29), near the gorge formed by the Flamicell river through the Sant Gervàs range
Hortoneda (45)
Pessonada (50)
El Pont de Claverol (11), seat of the ajuntament (town hall), to the west of la Pobla de Segur
Rivert (37)
Sant Martí de Canals (51)
Serradell (16)
Sossís (32), with a coal mine and hydroelectric power station
Toralla (23)
Torallola (16)

Demography

References

External links
Official website 
 Government data pages 

Municipalities in Pallars Jussà
Populated places in Pallars Jussà